Claudemir Jerônimo Barreto (born 27 March 1981), known as Cacau, is a former professional footballer who played as a striker. Born in Brazil, he represented Germany at international level.

Cacau received German citizenship in February 2009 and made his international debut in May that year in a friendly match against China. He was part of the German national team at the 2010 FIFA World Cup.

Club career

Early career
Cacau's career in Germany started with fifth-division side Türkgücü München in the 1999–2000 season, after which he went on to join 1. FC Nürnberg's reserve team. Following his good performances with the reserves, he was given his Bundesliga debut against Hansa Rostock on 18 November 2001. In only his second Bundesliga match, against Bayer Leverkusen on 8 December 2001, he scored two goals in Nürnberg's 4–2 defeat. He finished his first Bundesliga season with 6 goals in 17 appearances, but failed to repeat the success the following season, when he only scored 2 goals in 27 appearances and Nürnberg were relegated.

VfB Stuttgart

Having already signed a contract with VfB Stuttgart in January 2003, Cacau joined the club for the 2003–04 season. In his first season with Stuttgart, he also made four appearances in the UEFA Champions League In the 2004–05 season, he scored 12 Bundesliga goals and was the club's second-best goalscorer. In the first part of the same season, he also had a successful UEFA Cup campaign, netting three consecutive braces in Stuttgart's first three matches of the competition.

After an unsuccessful season in 2005–06, in which he only scored four Bundesliga goals for Stuttgart, he went on to be one of the key players in the club's run to the league title in 2007, once again becoming their second-best goalscorer with 13 goals, crucially netting both goals in their 2–0 win over Bayern Munich as well as the winning goal in a 3–2 away win over VfL Bochum in the final five rounds of the season. During the 2006–07 season, he also helped Stuttgart reach the final of the DFB-Pokal, scoring five goals in six matches, including the opening goal in the final against his former team Nürnberg. However, he was sent off 11 minutes later and Stuttgart went on to lose the final 3–2 after extra time.

In the 2007–08 season, he made further five appearances for Stuttgart in the UEFA Champions League and also scored his first goal in the competition, netting the equaliser in a 3–2 win over Rangers. He also helped the club finish sixth in the Bundesliga, netting 9 goals in 27 appearances during the season. In 2008–09, he scored 7 Bundesliga goals in 25 league matches, helping Stuttgart to finish third in the league.

On 20 February 2010, Cacau scored four goals in a 5–1 victory in an away game against 1. FC Köln. On 30 April, Cacau scored his final goal of the season in a 2–1 win away at 1899 Hoffenheim. This brought his tally to eight Bundesliga goals on the campaign. Following this, on 1 May 2010 Cacau extended his contract with VfB Stuttgart until the summer of 2013.

Cacau started the 2011–12 Bundesliga campaign in good form, scoring on a header against Schalke 04 on 6 August helping his side to a 3–0 win. He was called up to the German squad for their game against his native Brazil the following Wednesday.

On 22 March 2013, Cacau took a contract option which extended his contract with Stuttgart until June 2014.

Cerezo Osaka
On 11 August 2014, Cacau transferred to Cerezo Osaka. On 9 June 2015, he was released from his contract.

VfB Stuttgart II
On 1 February 2016, Cacau returned to Stuttgart and joined VfB Stuttgart II.

Retirement
Cacau announced his retirement from professional football on 11 October 2016.

International career

Although Cacau was born in Brazil, he was never called up by the Brazil national team.

In February 2009, he became eligible to play for Germany after he acquired a German passport having lived and played in Germany for over eight years.

On 19 May 2009, Cacau was called up by the German national team's coach Joachim Löw for their friendly matches against China and the United Arab Emirates. He made his international debut on 29 May 2009 in Germany's 1–1 draw against China, playing 27 minutes as a substitute for Mario Gómez. He also appeared in Germany's 7–2 win against the UAE four days later, playing the entire second half as a substitute for Lukas Podolski and providing an assist for Mario Gómez's third and Germany's fifth goal of the match just over a minute into the second half. He opened his account with the German national team, scoring a brace in a 3–0 win over Malta on 13 May 2010. He scored his first International goal for Germany in the group stage of the 2010 FIFA World Cup on 13 June 2010, coming on as a substitute against Australia, and scoring in 1:52 to make it 4–0. He later received a yellow card for diving in the match. After Miroslav Klose had been sent off against Serbia, Cacau played against Ghana but could not score in the 1–0 win. In the third-place World Cup game, Germany faced Uruguay on 10 July. He started for his German side but was eventually substituted out as Germany defeated Uruguay 3–2, taking third place at the World Cup.

Cacau remained regular for Germany in the qualifications for UEFA Euro 2012 in Poland and Ukraine. After making the 30-man preliminary squad, Cacau did not make Germany's 23-man Euro 2012 squad.

Personal life
Cacau's brother Vlademir Jeronimo Barreto, more commonly known as simply Vlademir, is also a footballer and lives in Mogi das Cruzes; he plays professionally for Paraná Clube.

Cacau is a committed Christian and says his faith is a big part of his life.

Since his naturalization as a German citizen in early 2009, Cacau's nickname at VfB Stuttgart (and later also at the Germany national team) is Helmut. This nickname was given to him by his Swiss Stuttgart teammate at the time, Ludovic Magnin, who stated that, as a German, Cacau should also have a proper German name.

Career statistics

Club

International goals
Scores and results list Germany's goal tally first, score column indicates score after each Cacau goal.

Honours
VfB Stuttgart
 Bundesliga: 2006–07
 DFB Pokal runner-up: 2006–07, 2012–13

Germany
 FIFA World Cup third Place: 2010

References

External links

  
 
 
 "Fussball-gott" 
 
 
 
 

Living people
1981 births
People from Santo André, São Paulo
Afro-Brazilian sportspeople
Brazilian Christians
German Christians
Naturalized citizens of Germany
German footballers
Germany international footballers
German expatriate sportspeople in Japan
2010 FIFA World Cup players
Bundesliga players
3. Liga players
Türkgücü München players
1. FC Nürnberg players
VfB Stuttgart players
VfB Stuttgart II players
Cerezo Osaka players
J1 League players
J2 League players
Brazilian footballers
Association football forwards
Brazilian expatriate sportspeople in Japan
Expatriate footballers in Japan
German expatriate footballers
Brazilian expatriate sportspeople in Germany
Brazilian emigrants to Germany
Recipients of the Order of Merit of Baden-Württemberg
Footballers from São Paulo (state)